Sematoptis is a genus of moth in the family Cosmopterigidae. It contains only one species, Sematoptis amphilychna, which is found in Chile.

References

External links
Natural History Museum Lepidoptera genus database

Cosmopteriginae
Endemic fauna of Chile